Playlist: The Very Best of Our Lady Peace is a compilation album consisting of select remastered recordings by alternative rock band Our Lady Peace. It is the band's second compilation album following A Decade, which was released in 2006.

Many popular favorites from Our Lady Peace, such as "One Man Army", "In Repair" and "Life", do not appear on the album. The album includes lesser-known band favorites including "Stealing Babies" and "The Wonderful Future". The album was released in the United States on March 31, 2009.

Track listing

"Starseed" (from Naveed)
"Naveed" (from Naveed)
"Superman's Dead" (from Clumsy)
"Clumsy" (from Clumsy)
"Car Crash" (from Clumsy)
"Stealing Babies" (from Happiness... Is Not a Fish That You Can Catch)
"Are You Sad" (from Spiritual Machines)
"The Wonderful Future" (from Spiritual Machines)
"Somewhere Out There" (from Gravity)
"Innocent" (from Gravity)
"Not Enough" (from Gravity)
"Apology" (from Healthy in Paranoid Times)
"Angels Losing Sleep" (from Healthy in Paranoid Times)
"Wipe That Smile Off Your Face" (from Healthy in Paranoid Times)

See also
Our Lady Peace discography
A Decade
Playlist (album series)

References

Our Lady Peace albums
Our Lady Peace
2009 compilation albums